The Crewe Railroaders are an American football team based in Crewe, Cheshire, England, founded in 1984. They play in NFC 2 West of the BAFA National Leagues and resumed playing competitive games in 2012, having reformed in 2010 after folding in 1990.

The team is the subject of a 2016 film called Gridiron UK, the screenplay of which was written by team founder, coach and player Gary Delaney.

History

The Crewe Railroaders were formed in November 1984 by Gary Delaney. A squad of 29 players travelled to take part in their first ever game - a pre-season friendly against the Leamington Royals in Wythall Park, Solihull, Birmingham on 2 June 1985, losing 13-50. Running Back Phil Oakes scored the first ever Railroaders Touchdown and Gary Delaney kicked the first ever extra point. Three weeks later they travelled to take on the Hereford Chargers as members of the United Kingdom American Football Association and became part of history by taking part in the first ever season of American Football in Great Britain. Eight games later the Railroaders were crowned inaugural Central Division Champions with a record of 5-2-1. In the playoffs, they lost in triple overtime to Dunstable Cowboys, a game that will always be remembered for Art Cooke’s Field Goal to win the game that agonizingly hit the cross bar and bounced back onto the field.

For their second season in 1986 the Railroaders joined the BAFL and faced much tougher opposition and were to face their arch enemies Stoke Spitfires a team they would beat twice during the season. Quarterback Gavin Meredith had a record breaking season as established himself as one of the most feared Quarterbacks in the country. Defensive End Ian Hollinshead created his own piece of history by being the only player chosen to play for the United Kingdom not from a top-flight team. Despite finishing with a winning record of 7-3-0 they failed to qualify for the playoffs.

During the off season the Railroaders began to break up. Key staff member Steve Arrowsmith defected to the Manchester Heroes and took Ian Hollinshead with him. The 1987 Budweiser League pre-season games were against the Manchester Spartans, Leicester Panthers and Black Country Nailers. A week before the season began Head Coach and founder Gary Delaney walked out on the club he founded and also joined the Manchester Heroes taking a few players with him. The first game of the season saw Crewe lose to their new rivals the Manchester Heroes. The Railroaders were to win only one game all season ironically away at the Heroes finishing 1-9-0 on the season. Crewe did have one highlight, Wide receiver Steve Valentine recorded the first ever 100 yd kick off return for a touchdown.

1988 saw Canadian Chris Rogers join the team. Crewe joined the BNGL and dropped down a division and annihilated their opposition throughout the season. They were crowned champions of the Midland Conference with an outstanding 9-1-0 record.

Before the 1989 BNGL season many of the star players had signed for other teams, the loss of Gavin Meredith and Steve Valentine to the Manchester Allstars being the biggest losses. The Railroaders began a new era under the guidance of Kevin Randle who renamed the team Railroaders '89. It was a winning season with a 5-4-1 record but the team was struggling for players, numbers had started to dwindle.

The 1990 was to be the Railroaders final season. It was to be a losing one with a record of 3-7-0. Gary Delaney had returned to the club but was unable to help a team in obvious decline.

Present Day

In 2010, former Railroaders got together and agreed that Crewe needed an American Football team again. These veterans were quickly joined by some newer players after a recruitment drive and a "rookie day" were held. The team were accepted to play in the BAFA National Leagues and are building for the future. The announcement came on the back of the away game against Durham and October's home game against the Staffordshire Stallions and followed a long process of the team proving its planning and sustainability to the British American Football Association.

At the start of 2015 and following on from a successful rookie recruitment drive, the club welcomed over 40 players for their first training session of the year. With new structures in place, the club hope to achieve their first winning season since the reformation of the club in 2010.

At the end of the 2019 season the Railroaders appointed Head Coach Jason Smith who has brought in a wealth of knowledge and experience to the team as well as an overhaul of the club's coaching structure.

References

External links

 Crewe Railoaders Official Website
 Gridiron UK at the Internet Movie Database

American football teams in England
Crewe
Sport in Cheshire
1984 establishments in England
American football teams established in 1984